Khaankhre Sobekhotep (now believed to be Sobekhotep II or Sobekhotep IV; known as Sobekhotep I in older studies)  was a pharaoh of the Thirteenth Dynasty of Egypt during the Second Intermediate Period.

Evidence
While Khaankhre Sobekhotep is regarded as a ruler of the 13th Dynasty, his chronological position is debated.

The Karnak king list preserves his prenomen Khaankhre. This list of kings was made during the reign of Thutmose III.

The Turin canon 6:15 preserves the nomen Sobek[hote]pre. The addition of -re may be a scribal error, as the correct entry would be Sobekhotep. This list of kings was made during the reign of Ramesses II. Khaankhre Sobekhotep is often associated with this entry, but it is not certain. The nomen Sobekhotep can refer to any king using this nomen, for instance Sobekhotep I. This part of the king list is also so fragmentary and uncertain that its hard to interpret. Other king lists, like the Abydos King List simply omitted all rulers between Amenemhat IV and Ahmose I - perhaps because they were minor kings who only controlled some estates or parts of the country in competition with other claimants.

At Abydos, Khaankhre Sobekhotep is attested by a relief from a chapel and a fragment of an inscribed column. His name Khaankhre Sobekhotep also appears on a granite statue pedestal.

At Dra' Abu el-Naga' (Thebes), a set of family burials have been found of which a small burial stele may refer to Sobekhotep II.

His reign was most likely short. Ryholt has suggested three to four-and-a-half years.

Theories
According to egyptologists Kim Ryholt and Darrell Baker, Khaankhre Sobekhotep was the 13th pharaoh of the dynasty and had a short reign ca. 1735 BC. Alternatively, Jürgen von Beckerath sees him as the 16th pharaoh of the dynasty.

Ryholt mentions that Sobekhotep I may be identical with Sobekhotep II, who is only mentioned as Sobekhotep in the Turin King List. Others, like Dodson, consider Khaankhre Sobekhotep II and Sekhemre Khutawy Sobekhotep I to be two different rulers from the 13th Dynasty, while Bierbrier lists Khaankhre Sobekhotep I and Sekhemre Khutawy Sobekhotep II. 

Recently Simon Connor and Julien Siesse investigated the style of the king's monument and argue that he reigned much later than previously thought (after Sobekhotep IV – who would become Sobekhotep III).

See also
 List of pharaohs

References

18th-century BC Pharaohs
Pharaohs of the Thirteenth Dynasty of Egypt